Spiridakos is a surname. Notable people with the surname include:

 Niki Spiridakos (born 1975), Canadian actress
 Tracy Spiridakos (born 1988), Canadian actress

Greek-language surnames